Claude Sauvage (18 July 1936 – 8 February 2011) was a French racing cyclist. He rode in the 1961 Tour de France.

References

1936 births
2011 deaths
French male cyclists
Place of birth missing